Megalopyge vulpina is a moth of the family Megalopygidae. It was described by William Schaus in 1900. It is found in Brazil.

The wingspan is about 36 mm. The wings are grey with a subterminal whitish line on the forewings. The fringe is darker.

References

Moths described in 1900
Megalopygidae